The Women's Senior T20 Trophy, previously known as the Senior Women's T20 League, is a women's Twenty20 cricket competition held in India. It began in the 2008–09 season, with 28 teams representing state cricket associations, whilst the most recent season, 2022–23, had 37 teams competing. Railways are the most successful team in the history of the competition, winning 11 titles, whilst Delhi and Punjab have won the competition once apiece.

History
The tournament began in the 2008–09 season, as the Senior Women's T20 Trophy, running along the Inter State Women's Competition, which ended after that season, and the Senior Women's One Day League. The results of the first tournament are not recorded.

Railways are the first recorded winners of the tournament, as they beat Maharashtra in the final of the 2009–10 competition by 5 wickets. Railways went on to dominate the competition, winning the next seven titles.

Delhi were the team to end Railways' winning streak in the 2017–18 season, as they topped the Elite Group Super League on Net Run Rate over Maharashtra and Baroda. The following season, 2018–19, Punjab claimed their first title, beating Karnataka in the final by 4 runs. Ahead of the 2019–20 season, the tournament was renamed the Women's Senior T20 Trophy, and Railways reclaimed their title, beating Bengal in the final by 8 wickets. The tournament scheduled to take place in 2020–21 was cancelled due to the COVID-19 pandemic, with only the Senior Women's One Day League going ahead. The tournament resumed in 2021–22, with Railways winning their tenth title. Railways again won the tournament in 2022–23.

Competition format
The Senior Women's T20 League has used various formats over the years. In the first season, 2008–09, 28 teams competed in round-robin groups across five zones, Central, East, North, South and West, with the top two from each group advancing to the knockout stages.

The format was altered for the following season, 2009–10. 26 teams now competed (with Manipur and Sikkim departing), initially in the same zonal groups as the previous season but with the top two now advancing to two "Super Leagues" of five teams apiece, with the winners of these leagues advancing to the final. This format was retained until the end of the 2012–13 season. 

For the 2013–14 season, the 26 teams were arranged into an Elite Group and a Plate Group, then further divided into Elite Groups A and B and Plate Groups A, B and C. The top two from each Plate Group went into a knockout round, with the two finalists playing for the Plate Group title whilst also both gaining promotion to the Elite Group for the following season. Meanwhile, the top two from each Elite Group went into a Super League of four teams, with the winner being crowned the Champions of the tournament. The format was retained until the end of the 2017–18, with the only adjustment being for the addition of Chhattisgarh ahead of the 2016–17 season.

Ahead of the 2018–19 season, nine teams were added to the competition: newly added were Arunachal Pradesh, Bihar, Meghalaya, Mizoram, Nagaland, Pondicherry and Uttarakand, as well as the returning Manipur and Sikkim. The 36 teams were divided into five groups, with the top two from each group advancing to two Super Leagues of five teams apiece. The winner of each Super League advanced to the final. The format was broadly retained for the following season, with Chandigarh added, as well as semi-finals (with the top two from each Super League now qualifying for the knockout rounds). In 2021–22, teams were now divided into five Elite Groups and one Plate Group, with the top two from each Elite Group and the top one from the Plate Group progressing to the knockout stages. In 2022–23, the format changed again, with all the teams divided into five groups and eleven teams progressing to the knockout stages.

Matches are played using a Twenty20 format. In the most recent edition of the tournament, teams received 4 points for a win, 2 for a tie, no result or abandonment, and 0 for a loss. Positions in the tables was determined firstly by points, then by wins, then by head-to-head record and finally by Net Run Rate.

Teams

Tournament results

References

Twenty20 cricket leagues
  
Women's cricket competitions in India
Cricket
India
Indian domestic cricket competitions
2009 establishments in India